Hoseynabad Sar Kazeh (also Romanized as Ḩoseynābād Sar Kāzeh; also known as Ḩoseynābād) is a village in Banestan Rural District, in the Central District of Behabad County, Yazd Province, Iran. At the 2006 census, its population was 109, in 27 families.

References 

Populated places in Behabad County